Ruse of Engagement (literally "The Traitor Escapes") is a Hong Kong action crime television drama produced by TVB. Created by Amy Wong, the drama follows two brothers who work as paramilitary officers in the Anti-Terrorist Force (ATF), a fictional intelligence agency inspired by the Counter Terrorism Response Unit of the Hong Kong police force. Ruse of Engagement aired on 17 March to 18 April 2014 on TVB Jade with 25 episodes.

Synopsis
A bright environment does not mean that darkness does not exist, a peaceful society does not mean that danger does not exist. This era needs a vigilant society to be prepared for emergencies and unexpected events. Although natural disasters and violent acts cause people to panic, the scariest is actually people's mind. As such, decisive action must be taken to stop these terrorists from creating trouble in society, including Hong Kong itself.

After an encounter with some terrorists and barely making out of the scene alive, Carson and Alfred, two brothers raised by their widowed mother Tong Shuk-fun, join the ATF together, an agency under the Security Bureau (Hong Kong). Each specialising in a different talent, Carson succeeds in the force's intelligence unit while Alfred joins ATF's operations unit. With both brothers earning the respect and trust of their superior, ACP Steve Shum, Shuk-fun thought that it was finally time for her to retire in peace.

However, after receiving a piece of intelligence, the two brothers suddenly change sides and become enemies. Carson discovers reliable information about a secret organization through journalist Yip Ting, and he almost loses his life investigating it. Yip Ting saves Carson but Carson is exposed of his lies as he attempts to protect Yip Ting. Carson attempts to seek revenge as the ATF members believe he has strayed to their enemy's side. Unable to reinstate himself back in the team, he convinces his girlfriend Jessica, an intelligence analyst for ATF, to secretly obtain information from the force's database to help with his investigation. Carson later bombs the ATF headquarters but find out afterwards he had been seeking help from someone who he thought was a friend of his.

With details of the case leaking to the opposing organization, Alfred believes that his brother is the mole. Meanwhile, Carson focuses his efforts on luring the real mole, abandoning all ethics in the process. The situation worsens as it is believed that the secret organisation in Hong Kong plans to spread a virus and earn money from it. Would the ATF be able to stop them before they infect the entire world?

Main Cast
Louise Lee as Tong Shuk-fun
Ruco Chan as Carson Chong Yau-ching 
Ron Ng as Alfred Chong Yau-kit
Aimee Chan as Jessica Chung Yat-ka
Yoyo Mung as Yip Ting

Recurring Cast
Eddie Kwan as Steven Shum Chi-ngo
Lai Lok-yi as "Negative" Fu Wang-leung
Kenny Wong as Ko Wai
Law Lok-lam as Kiu Kim-hang
Joseph Lee as Chung Lai-him
Vivien Yeo as Yeung Lok-man
Leanne Li as Betty "Beauty" Yeung Yan-mei
Pancy Chan as Bonnie (Security)
Andy Lau as Alan
Alan Luk as Don Chan Ho-pong
Fred Cheng as Eric Lee Kam
Wu Kei-fung as Ben
Fok Kin-bong as Cheung Yiu
Jacky Lei as Lawrence
Hà Vĩnh Phát as Võ Đình
Vin Choi as Chung Ching-nam
Li Shing-cheong as Wong Kwok-wing
Kim Li
Dickson Lee as Paul Sir
Calvin Chan
Joey Law
Otto Chan
Bond Chan
Gill Mohindepaul Singh
Steven Ho

Development
Ruse of Engagement was a drama that was warehoused for three years by TVB. First introduced to audiences at the 2010 TVB Sales Presentation, then known as the working title "ATF". Production began in May 2011 with Ka Wai Nam (賈偉南) helming the screenplay. Production for the anticipated drama was completed in early September 2011, and post-production work, including the soundtrack additions were completed by late 2012, but for unknown reasons, the broadcast date was pushed back several times by TVB . In May 2013, TVB promoted Ruse of Engagement as one of its top 17 productions to look forward to at the 17th HK FILMART. In early January 2014, TVB finally confirmed that Ruse of Engagement will premiere in March of this year.

Viewership ratings

International broadcast
  - NTV7
  - Channel U (10pm)

References

External links
TVB Official Website
K-TVB.net English Synopsis

TVB dramas
Hong Kong police procedural television series
2014 Hong Kong television series debuts
2014 Hong Kong television series endings